The Fresh Air Fund is a 501(c)(3) not-for-profit agency founded in 1877. At sleep-away camps in New York’s Mid-Hudson Valley, visiting volunteer host families along the East Coast in NYC-based programs, children get to have new experiences, learn new skills and gain new perspectives. Fresh Air children also participate in year-round leadership, career exploration and educational programs. The Fresh Air Fund has served more than 1.8 million children since their founding.

History 
In 1877, The Fresh Air Fund was created to allow children living in underserved communities the chance to enjoy free summer experiences in the country.  
Reverend Willard Parsons, a minister who had just moved from New York City to a small, rural parish in Sherman, Pennsylvania, asked members of his congregation to provide country vacations as volunteer host families for New York City’s neediest children. This was the beginning of The Fresh Air Fund. By 1881, the work of The Fund was expanding so rapidly that Reverend Parsons asked for and secured support from The New York Tribune. By 1888, The Fund was incorporated as The Tribune Fresh Air Fund Aid Society.  Today, Fresh Air continues to depend on favorable publicity from the media with assistance from The New York Times.

Volunteer host family program, "Friendly Towns" 
Fresh Air children ages 8 to 14 years old are given the opportunity to visit with host families to experience the joys of summer in the country. Fresh Air children are registered by more than 90 participating social services and community organizations located in disadvantaged neighborhoods in the five boroughs of New York City. First-time visitors, eight to 14 years old, spend one or two weeks with their host family. Youth who are re-invited by the same family may continue with The Fund through age 18 and may enjoy longer summertime visits year after year.

Friendly Towns host families are volunteers who live in the suburbs or small town communities. Host families range in size and background but share the desire to open their hearts and homes to give city children an experience they will never forget. Hosts say the Fresh Air experience is as enriching for their own families, as it is for the children. There are no financial requirements for hosting a child.

The majority of Fresh Air children are from underserved communities, often without the resources to send their children on summer experiences. Children create lifelong memories of riding bikes, swimming at the beach, visiting local attractions and making new friends.

In every Friendly Town, there is a volunteer committee and Chairperson responsible for the program. The committee publicizes the program, screens applications, checks references, interviews families in their homes and approves new hosts. The committee members also make follow-up visits to all participating host families every three years. The Friendly Town committee assists hosts while Fresh Air children are visiting and often plans group activities during the trips. The Fresh Air Fund provides support to Fund Representatives, Chairpeople and host families 24 hours a day, when Fresh Air children are visiting their towns.

Summer camping for New York City children 
The Fresh Air Fund owns and operates five camps located on The Fund’s Sharpe Reservation  in Fishkill, New York, 65 miles north of New York City. Sharpe Reservation has 2,300 acres of land with lakes, ponds, streams and hiking trails through the woods. The Fund's sixth camp, Camp Junior, is located in Harriman State Park.

Camp Tommy is The Fund's camp for boys, ages 12 to 15. Camp Tommy offers hiking, nature and other outdoor programs designed to develop cooperation and encourage team building. Major improvements and recently constructed facilities have created opportunities for significant educational programs, such as literacy and career skills development, computer workshops, photography and music. Originally Camp Pioneer from 1948-1998, Camp Tommy's inaugural year was 1999. Camp Tommy is named after Tommy Hilfiger, a supporter of The Fresh Air Fund.

Camp Hayden-Marks Memorial serves boys each session, age nine to 12. Campers take part in outdoor activities including sports, cooperative games, boating, arts and crafts, drama, science and hiking. Boys at Hayden-Marks Memorial also benefit from educational activities, including computers, video, music and art.

At Camp ABC, girls ages 9-15 live in small groups where they learn to develop self-confidence, independence and teamwork skills. Educational programs promote environmental awareness, cultural arts and physical fitness in a fun, safe, supportive environment. Camp ABC has a Leaders-in-Training program for 13 – 15 year olds, which focuses on personal growth, aiming for developing self-confidence and leadership skills. 

Camp Hidden Valley serves 130 girls and boys with and without special needs, ages eight to 12. At this unique camp, children with and without disabilities live and play together. Camp activities include art, hiking, nature and creative writing. The specially designed pool complex is utilized by all campers, including children who use wheelchairs, braces or other forms of assistance.

Camp Mariah, The Fund's Career Awareness Camp, provides the opportunity for adolescents to explore educational paths and career options, while enjoying camp adventures. Camp Mariah offers a unique setting to engage boys and girls in an educational curriculum and prepare them for the world of work. Intensive three-and-a-half-week summer sessions and weekend camping trips are complemented by year-round activities in New York City. Children must be in the sixth grade to apply for the Career Awareness Program. Camp Mariah is named after Board member Mariah Carey.

Camp Junior, in memory of  Lesandro “Junior” Guzman-Feliz, a 15 year-old victim of gang violence, is operated by The Fresh Air Fund in partnership with New York State Parks, Recreation and Historic Preservation, Assembly Speaker Carl E. Heastie, Bronx Borough President Vanessa L. Gibson and the Palisades Interstate Park Commission. The camp is for boys and girls, ages 8-15, all from the Bronx.

Year-round programs and off-season camping 
The Fund has expanded its initiative recently to intensify its relationship with young campers. Boys and girls from Camps Hayden-Marks Memorial, Hidden Valley and Anita Bliss Coler (ABC) participate in weekend camping programs in the fall, winter and spring. Activities included hiking, cooking, arts and crafts and cooperative games.

The Counselor-In-Training (CIT) Program at Camps Anita Bliss Coler (ABC) and Hayden-Marks Memorial have expanded tremendously in recent years. The majority of the CITs are former campers. All CITs must be 16 and 17 years old at the beginning of the summer. During summer and weekend camp visits, young people acquire supervisory skills to become future camp counselors. They develop leadership, team-building and communications skills through a year-round program.

Career Awareness Programs 
The Career Awareness Program focuses on expanding the education and career options of New York City adolescents. Boys and girls, ages 12 to 14, make a commitment for three years in order to participate in specially designed educational, recreational and camping experiences in New York City and at Camp Mariah. All students register in the spring of 6th grade. After completion of the 6th grade school year, they begin the program in the summer.

References

External links 
 Inner-city children, country summers: narrating American childhood and the geographies of whiteness a discussion of media representations of the Fresh Air Fund and issues of race

Organizations based in New York City
1877 establishments in New York (state)